Karim M. Khan  is a former sport and exercise medicine physician who served as editor in chief of the British Journal of Sports Medicine from 2008-2020. He was awarded the Officer of the Order of Australia in 2019 for "distinguished service to sport and exercise medicine and to the promotion of physical activity for community health"  and an Honorary Fellowship of the Faculty of Sport and Exercise Medicine (UK) in 2014.

Professor Khan was born in Germany. His father (Rahim Miran-Khan) was Afghan, his mother (Ingeborg née Kallus) German. His family immigrated to Australia in 1965. Karim moved to Canada in 1997  and was hired at the University of British Columbia, Vancouver, in July 2000. Currently, he is a professor at UBC  and the Scientific Director of the CIHR Institute of Musculoskeletal Health and Arthritis (CIHR-IMHA).

Editor of the British Journal of Sports Medicine 

Over the time of Karim Khan’s office as the Editor-in-Chief, the British Journal of Sports Medicine (BJSM) rose from being 12th-ranked journal in the sports science and medicine field with an impact factor of 3.7 in 2012, increasing its impact factor each year  to one of the leaders in this field. It had a 2021 impact factor of 13.8.

Clinical Sports Medicine

Along with Peter Brukner, Karim Khan published 5 editions of the textbook Brukner and Khan's Clinical Sports Medicine. It has been described as the Bible of Sports Medicine. The quality of the authorship has been lauded for drawing leaders in the fields of sports medicine and physiotherapy in particular  and for its multidisciplinary content.

Tendon and physical activity aesearch

Khan played an important role in changing nomenclature of tendinitis to the preferred term of tendinopathy (or tendinosis) with the insight that the primary pathology is degenerative rather than inflammatory.

He has been credited with promoting the importance of Physical Activity for general health.

He has published over 350 works with over 35,000 citations and an H-index of 101.

References

External links
 www.bjsm.bmj.com
 Clinical Sports Medicine
 https://csm.mhmedical.com/
 

Living people
Australian sports physicians
Officers of the Order of Australia
University of Melbourne alumni
Australian medical researchers
Medical journal editors
Academic journal editors
1960 births